The Castle of Charles V (Italian: Castello Carlo quinto; Leccese: Castellu Carlu Quintu), also known as the Castello di Lecce, is a castle in Lecce, Italy. It was first built in the Middle Ages, and was strengthened by Charles V in 1539, to a design by the architect Gian Giacomo dell’Acaya. To build this fortress two constructions were pulled down: the Chapel of the Trinity and the Monastery of the Benedictine Order of the Saint Cross. The castle did not have only defensive functions, in the 18th century one of its rooms was used as a theatre. From 1870 to 1979 it was used as military district. Nowadays it is the seat of the Cultural Affairs of the township of Lecce, a backdrop for many cultural initiatives. Visitors can remain charmed with the delicate ornaments of the interiors: the capitals and the decorated big room, with imposing big stained glass windows. The rooms of the upstairs are sustained by imposing stone columns. There is a legend linked with this castle: it tells that the family which owned this castle in the 14th century, the Orsini del Balzo family, kept a white bear in the moat of the castle. This animal was a status symbol and, at the same time, it scared prowlers.

References

Infrastructure completed in 1539
Castles in Apulia
Buildings and structures in Lecce
Charles V, Holy Roman Emperor
1539 establishments in the Spanish Empire